Arque River is one of the headwaters of Río Grande and Mamoré River in Bolivia. 

The river flows 50 km in a southeasterly direction before it turns northeast. At kilometer 58 there is the provincial capital Arque on the northern bank of the river, at kilometer 72 the village Umani on the southern bank, and at kilometer 85 the town of Capinota on the northern bank.

The watershed of Arque River comprises 2.224 km2. At Capinota, the base flow of the river is 2 to 2.5 m³/s. However, when the river rises during the rainy season (November–April), the flow  can be up to 900 m³/s. The sediments which Arque River carries in the rainy season can be up to 120 g/L.

Caine River' after another 162 km merges into Rìo Grande which after a total of 1,438 km from the source of Rocha River joins Ichilo River.

Arque